The Auckland volcanic field is an area of monogenetic volcanoes covered by much of the metropolitan area of Auckland, New Zealand's largest city, located in the North Island. The approximately 53 volcanoes in the field have produced a diverse array of maars (explosion craters), tuff rings, scoria cones, and lava flows. With the exception of Rangitoto, no volcano has erupted more than once, but the other eruptions lasted for various periods ranging from a few weeks to several years. Rangitoto erupted several times and recently twice; in an eruption that occurred about 600 years ago, followed by a second eruption approximately 50 years later. The field is fuelled entirely by basaltic magma, unlike the explosive subduction-driven volcanism in the central North Island, such as at Mount Ruapehu and Lake Taupō. The field is currently dormant, but could become active again.

Features 

The field ranges from Lake Pupuke and Rangitoto Island in the north to Matukutururu (Wiri Mountain) in the south, and from Mount Albert in the west to Pigeon Mountain in the east.

The first vent erupted at Pupuke 193,200 ± 2,800 years ago. The most recent eruption (about 600 years ago and within historical memory of the local Māori) was of Rangitoto, an island shield volcano just east of the city, erupting 0.7 cubic kilometres of lava. The last volcano to erupt was much bigger than all others, with Rangitoto making up 41 per cent of the field's entire volume of erupted material with characteristics as to slope and symmetry around the eruptive vents seen in basaltic shield volcanoes as might be expected in a volcano, that may have buried other volcanoes, and now known to have a 1000 year odd eruptive history.

Lake Pupuke, on the North Shore near Takapuna, is a volcanic explosion crater. A few similar craters such as Ōrākei Basin are open to the sea.

The field has produced voluminous lava flows that cover much of the Auckland isthmus. One of the longest runs from Mt Saint John northward, almost crossing the Waitematā Harbour to form Meola Reef. More than 50 lava tubes and other lava caves have been discovered, including the -long Wiri Lava Cave. Two impressive depressions caused by lava cave collapses are the Puka Street Grotto and the nearby Hochstetter Pond, also known as Grotto Street Pond, in Onehunga.

For most of the 200,000 years that the field has been erupting, the planet has been in glacial periods (ice ages) where sea levels were much lower due to water being locked up as ice, and the Waitemata and Manukau Harbours were dry land. All the volcanoes probably erupted on land except for Rangitoto, which erupted during the current interglacial (warmer) period.

Tectonic relationships 

The volcanoes are located south of a geological region called the Northland Allochthon, and with the northern volcanoes located over early Miocene sedimentary deposits of the Waitematā Group of rocks and the southern volcanoes over post Miocene sediments. A large proportion of the volcanoes in the field, particularly those with cone structures, lie within  of inferred or known faults, with the qualification that these are inactive historic faults and unlike in many other volcanic fields it is rare for volcanoes to be actually on the fault line. The structure of these Auckland regional faults and the resulting fault blocks is complex but like the volcanic field their locations can be postulated to be related to gravitational variations and where the Stokes Magnetic Anomaly passes through this section of the North Island.
The field is part of the Auckland Volcanic Province which comprises four volcanic fields with intra-plate basaltic volcanism starting in the south, at Okete, near Raglan in late Pliocene times (2.7-1.8 Ma). Activity has since moved north through the Ngatutura, South Auckland and Auckland fields since then.

Human context

Mythology 

Tāmaki Māori myths describe the creation of the volcanic field as a creation of Mataaho (the guardian of the earth's secrets) and his brother Rūaumoko (the god of earthquakes and volcanoes), made as punishment against a tribe of patupaiarehe, supernatural beings living in the Waitākere Ranges, who used deadly magic from the earth to defeat a war party of patupaiarehe from the Hunua Ranges. In some traditions, the fire goddess Mahuika creates the volcanic field as a way to warm Mataaho, after his wife leaves and takes his clothing. Because of their close association to Mataaho, the volcanic features can be collectively referred to as Nga Maunga a Mataaho ("The Mountains of Mataaho"), or Ngā Huinga-a-Mataaho ("the gathered volcanoes of Mataaho"). Many of the volcanic features of Māngere can be referred to as Nga Tapuwae a Mataoho ("The Sacred Footprints of Mataoho"), including Māngere Lagoon, Waitomokia, Crater Hill, Kohuora, Pukaki Lagoon and Robertson Hill. Many of the Māori language names of volcanic features in the field refer to Mataaho by name, including Te Pane o Mataaho (Māngere Mountain), Te Tapuwae a Mataoho (Robertson Hill) and Te Kapua Kai o Mataoho (the crater of Maungawhau / Mount Eden).

Usage 
Many of the maunga (mountains) were occupied by substantial Māori pā (fortifications) before Pākehā settlement, and many terraces and other archeological remnants are still visible. Many of the cones have been levelled or strongly altered, in small part due to the historical Māori use, but mostly through relatively recent quarrying of construction materials (especially scoria). However many of the remaining volcanoes are now preserved as landmarks and parks.

The warmer northern sides of the mountains were also popular among early Pākehā settlers for housing. In the 1880s, Takarunga / Mount Victoria and Maungauika / North Head were developed as military installations due to fears of a Russian invasion. The cones are also protected by a 1915 law, the Reserves and Other Lands Disposal and Public Bodies Empowering Act 1915, which was passed due to early concern that the distinctive landscape was being eroded, especially by quarrying. While often ignored until the late 20th century, it has amongst other things minimised severe changes to Mount Roskill proposed by Transit New Zealand for the Southwestern Motorway.

In March 2007, New Zealand submitted the volcanic field, with several specifically named features, as a World Heritage Site candidate based on its unique combination of natural and cultural features. At that time, only 2 per cent of more than 800 World Heritage Sites worldwide were in this "mixed" category.

For most of Auckland's post-1840 history, the mountains have been administered variously by the New Zealand Crown, the Auckland Council (or its former bodies including the Auckland City Council and Manukau City Council) or the Department of Conservation.

In the 2014 Treaty of Waitangi settlement between the Crown and the Ngā Mana Whenua o Tāmaki Makaurau collective of 13 Auckland iwi and hapu (also known as the Tāmaki Collective), ownership of the 14 Tūpuna Maunga (ancestral mountains) of Tāmaki Makaurau / Auckland, was vested to the collective. The legislation specified that the land be held in trust "for the common benefit of Ngā Mana Whenua o Tāmaki Makaurau and the other people of Auckland". The Tūpuna Maunga o Tāmaki Makaurau Authority or Tūpuna Maunga Authority (TMA) is the co-governance organisation established to administer the 14 Tūpuna Maunga. Auckland Council manages the Tūpuna Maunga under the direction of the TMA.

Dangers 

Since the field is not extinct, new volcanic events may occur at any time, though the usual period between events is, on average, somewhere between hundreds to thousands of years. There has been at least one eruption in every 2,500 years over the last 50,000 years. However, the effects of such an event—especially a full-scale eruption—would be substantial, ranging from pyroclastic surges to earthquakes, lava bombs, ash falls, and the venting volcanic gas, as well as lava flows. These effects might continue for several months, potentially causing substantial destruction and disruption, ranging from the burial of substantial tracts of residential or commercial property, to the mid-to-long-term closures of major parts of the country's infrastructure such as the Port of Auckland, the State Highway network, or the Auckland Airport. It is possible that several volcanoes could erupt simultaneously. There is strong evidence that eight erupted within a span of 3000 years or so, between 31,000 and 28,000 years ago.

However the same amount of magma can have an order of magnitude different impact. This contrasts with the about  diameter cone produced by the same amount of upwelling magma that might be expected to destroy an area of  if there is no ground water interaction. Modelling has suggested that the next eruption in the volcanic field is likely to be associated with water and in the area extending from the central city to its north and northeast suburbs surrounding and including the Waitemata Harbour. Within New Zealand the volcanic hazard of the field is graded below that of Taupo Volcanic Zone volcano's but is likely to be perceived by the population affected as a greater potential nuisance if it occurs

Various operative structures, plans and systems have been set up to prepare responses to volcanic activity within the urban areas, mainly coordinated in the Auckland Volcanic Field Contingency Plan of the Auckland Regional Council, which provides a framework for interaction of civil defence and emergency services during an eruption. This is likely to give between a few hours and several days' warning of an impending eruption, and its approximate location.

Auckland War Memorial Museum, itself built on the crater rim of Pukekawa, has an exhibition on the field, including the "Puia Street multi-sensory visitor experience", which simulates a grandstand view of an eruption in Auckland.

List of volcanoes 
The volcanoes within the field are:

See also 
Geology of the Auckland Region
List of volcanoes in New Zealand
Volcanism in New Zealand
Stratigraphy of New Zealand
South Auckland volcanic field

References

Further reading 
Lava and Strata: A guide to the volcanoes and rock formations of Auckland. Homer, Lloyd; Moore, Phil & Kermode, Les; Landscape Publications and the Institute of Geological and Nuclear Sciences, 2000. .
"Probabilistic assessment of future vent locations and eruption styles for the Auckland Volcanic Field, New Zealand". Magill, Christina R; McAneney, K.J.; Proceedings of the International Association for Mathematical Geology 2003, Portsmouth, UK, 7–12 September 2003.
Volcanic risk ranking for Auckland, New Zealand. I: Methodology and hazard investigation. Magill, Christina R.; Blong, Russell; Bulletin of Volcanology, Volume 67, Issue 4, April 2005, Pages 331 – 339, DOI 10.1007/s00445-004-0374-6, accessed 2006-07-14.
City of Volcanoes: A geology of Auckland. Searle, Ernest J.; revised by Mayhill, R.D.; Longman Paul, 1981. First published 1964. .
"Facies analysis of pyroclastic deposits within basaltic tuff-rings of the Auckland volcanic field, New Zealand (abstract)". Sharon R. Allen, Vivienne F. Bryner, Ian E. M. Smith, Peter F. Ballance, New Zealand Journal of Geology and Geophysics, 1996, Vol. 39: 309–327.
Volcanoes of Auckland: A Field Guide. Hayward, B.W.; Auckland University Press, 2019, 335 pp. .

External links 

Volcanic hazards, Auckland Council

Geology: Rocks and minerals, School of Geography, Geology and Environmental Science, University of Auckland (with interactive maps, requiring Apple QuickTime).

 
Potentially active volcanoes
Monogenetic volcanic fields
Geography of Auckland
Landforms of the Auckland Region

Volcanism of New Zealand
Geology of New Zealand
Volcanoes of the Auckland Region
Auckland Volcanic Province